Edward Ballard (1820–1897) was an English physician.

Edward Ballard may also refer to:

Edward George Ballard (1791–1860), English writer
Edward J. Ballard  ( 1790–1813), United States Navy officer